Cosiţeni may refer to several villages in Romania:

 Cosiţeni, a village in Brăhășești Commune, Galaţi County
 Cosiţeni, a village in Podu Iloaiei Town, Iaşi County